Jangheung O clan was one of the Korean clans. Their Bon-gwan was in Jangheung County, South Jeolla Province. According to the research in 2000, the number of Jangheung O clan was 3564. O Cheon-u was a 7th descendant of  who was a founder of Boseong O clan. O Hyeon-pil was a 24th descendant of O Cheom who came over from China to Silla during Jijeung of Silla’s reign in Silla dynasty. O Cheon-u passed Imperial examination during Taejong of Joseon’s reign in Joseon dynasty. As a result, O Cheon-u served as Byeongmajeoldosa and was appointed as Prince of Jangheung. Then, O Cheon-u began Jangheung O clan.

See also 
 Korean clan names of foreign origin

References

External links 
 

 
Korean clan names of Chinese origin